Moose Toys (or Moose Enterprises or Moose Creative Management Pty Ltd or The Moose Group) is an Australian-owned toy design, development and distribution company founded in 1985. Moose is headquartered in Australia, has over 600 staff and distributes to over 100 countries.

History

In 1985, Moose Toys was founded by Brian Hamersfeld.
Later in 2001, Moose was acquired by Chief Executives Manny Stul, Jacqui Tobias and Paul Solomon. The company is based in Cheltenham, Melbourne, Australia

From the 2000s to 2015, revenue for the company grew from $10 million to more than $900 million.

'In 2011, Paul Solomon led a move to distribute Moose Toys products directly into US retail (which ends its distributor license with Canadian toy company Spin Master), starting with a collectible brand called "The Trash Pack".

In 2014, Moose Toys launched the Shopkins toy line which later grew into a franchise in later years with spin-offs and other merchandise and relocated its main office to Cheltenham, in Melbourne, Australia. The brand in late 2014 also changed its logo design.

In 2015, at the 15th annual Toy Industry Association's Toy of the Year (TOTY) Awards ceremony held in New York City, Moose Toys' Shopkins Small Mart was awarded the '2015 Girl Toy of the Year'

In 2016, Moose was recognised as Toy Vendor of the year in the US by Toys R Us. Target and Walmart CEO Manny Stul also won the EY World Entrepreneur Year Award, and is the first Australian to do so. 

In 2016, Shopkins won girl toy of the year for the second time running for the Shopkins Scoops Ice Cream Truck at the 16th annual Toy Industry Association's Toy of the Year Awards. 

In 2017, Manny Stul was inducted into the Australian Toy Industry Hall of Fame. 

In 2018, Moose Toys acquired Worlds Apart as part of a European expansion. 

In 2019, The Moose portfolio continued to diversify as the business entered the preschool category with Kindi Kids, a Shopkins spin-off which features the popular Shoppies line of dolls as preschoolers.

In 2021, Moose Toys was awarded with five wins at the Australian Toy Awards. Moose also expanded into the Canadian market with the launch of a hybrid direct distribution model for a strategic selection of new brands, including Akedo and Bluey. 

In 2022, Moose Toys was awarded a TOTY for Creative Toy of the Year - Magic Mixies.

In 2023, Moose Toys took home four awards at the Australian Toy Awards.

Shopkins

Shopkins are a collectible line of figures based on The Trash Pack figures, designed, and developed by the Moose team in Melbourne, Australia.

Shopkins toys are miniature store item characters. Each Shopkins character is given a name, hobby, hang out, and BFF, intended to create an emotional bond for the collector.

Each new series of Shopkins combines 140+ characters with playsets and accessories. As of December 2015, there are 420 individual characters.

Originally released in June 2014, by December 2015 over 115 million Shopkins had been sold worldwide. Due to the toy line's popularity, it expanded into a franchise including licensed merchandise and spin-offs for the toy line (notably the Shopkins Shoppies line of dolls, Happy Places in which people can decorate homes with Petkins furniture, Cutie Cars which are miniature Shopkins cars, Lil' Secrets, a line similar to Polly Pocket, and Kindi Kids, a Shoppies-spin-off doll line for preschoolers.)  Paul Solomon credits his mother Jacqui Tobias, director of girls' products, for the idea of Shopkins.

In December 2015, a one-of-kind glass Shopkin called Gemma Stone sold for $21,500 on eBay with all proceeds going to the Toy Industry Foundation.

Other Product Lines
Moose Toys creates, manufactures, and markets toy brands across a number of categories, including action figure, plush, dolls, and so on. Most have a collectible component and include a sheet of other products within the toy line.

	Akedo 
	Beados 
	Blingle Bands 
	Dream Seekers 
	Goo Jit Zu 
	Knuckleheads
	Little Live Pets 
 Little Live "Gotta Go" Pets (sub-brand)
	Magic Mixies 
	Mighty Beanz 
	Mutant Mania
	Pikmi Pops 
	Really Rad Robots 
	Scruff A Luvs 
	Scrunch Miez 
	Smell'ems
	Squeakee 
	The Grossery Gang 
	The Trash Pack 
	Treasure X

Recent Awards

 2023 Australian Toy Awards: Doll Product of the Year – Magic Mixies Castle Play Set 

 2023 Australian Toy Awards:  Australian Development Product of the Year  - Little Live Pets Mama Surprise 

 2023 Australian Toy Awards: Judges Choice Award – Cookeez Makery 
	2023 Australian Toy Awards: Electronic Product of the Year – Magic Mixies Crystal Ball 
	2022 Mastermind Toys Most Innovative Toy : Magic Mixies Crystal Ball
	2022 Big W Innovation of the Year : Magic Mixies Crystal Ball
	2022 UK Dream Toys List : Little Live Pets Mama Surprise
	2022 UK Dream Toys List : Magic Mixies Mixlings Castle Playset
	2022 UK Dream Toys List : Heroes of Goo Jit Zu Shifters Hero Pack
	2022 TOTY (American Toy Association) : Creative Toy of the Year : Magic Mixies Crystal Ball
	2022 PureWow Happy Kids Best Toy Kids Aged 4-7: Magic Mixies Mixlings Magic Castle Playset
	2022 Toy Designer of the Year Award at the Mojo Nation Play Creator Awards for Magic Mixies
	2022 Best Licensed Toys or Games Range for Bluey at the British Licensing Awards
	2022 Grand Prix du Jouet: Akedo: Triple Tag Arena
	2022 Grand Prix du Jouet: Little Live Pets: Mama Surprise
	2022 TOTY: Creative Toy of the Year: Magic Mixies 
	2022 ATA Australian Toy of the Year Award: Magic Mixies 
	2022 ATA Development Toy of the Year: Treasure X 
	2022 ATA Action Toy of the Year: Treasure X
	2022 ATA Craft & Activity Toy of the Year: Blingle Bands 
	2022 ATA Electronic Toy of the Year: Magic Mixies 
	2022 ATA Plush Toy of the Year: Scruff-A-Luvs 
	2021 UK Toy Industry Interactive Toy of the Year: Magic Mixies 
	2021 UK Toy Industry Action Toy of the Year: Real Littles 
	2021 French Grand Prix du Jouet  Toy of the Year: Magic Mixies 
	2021 French Grand Prix du Jouet Magic Toys :  Magic Mixies 
	2021 French Grand Prix du Jouet  Electronic Toys (Friends): Little Live Pets 
	2021 French Grand Prix du Jouet  Fighting Game Toys: Akedo 
	2021 Global Toy of the Year – Spanish Association of Toy Manufacturers: Magic Mixies
	2021 Electronic Toy of the Year – Spanish Association of Toy Manufacturers: Magic Mixies
	2021 ATA Judges Choice Award: Bluey Pool Time Playset 
	2021 ATA Australian Development Product of The Year: Treasure X Aliens -Ultimate Dissection 
	2021 ATA Action Product of the Year: Treasure X Sunken Treasure Ship 
	2021 ATA Craft & Activity Product of the year: JelliRez StyleMi Assortment 
	2021 ATA Plush Product of the Year: Bluey & Friends Basic Plush 
	2020 Walmart Toy Supplier of the Year
	2020 ATA Australian Development Product of the Year: Treasure X Kings Gold: Treasure Tomb 
	2020 ATA Collectable of the Year: Shopkins Lil' Shopper Pack, Australian Toy Awards 
	2020 London Toy Fair Hero Toy of the Fair: Kindi Kids 
	2020 London Toy Fair Action Figure of the Year: Heroes of Goo Jit Zu 
	2019 ATA Action figure of the Year: Treasure X Aliens  
	2019 TOTY : Plush Toy of the Year: Scruff A Luvs 
	2019 London Toy Fair Plush Toy of the year, Scruff A Luvs: London Toy Fair

Content

Animation
In 2014, Moose partnered with Pixel Zoo to create Shopkins animated content, including the webisodes.
For the launch of Shopkins, a series of animated Webisodes were created for the ShopkinsWorld YouTube channel (now MooseTube Squad). There have been 85 released, along with 6 original music video clips, and has gained millions of views. WildBrain distributes Shopkins content on their channels (including the WildBrain - Cutie Cartoons channel) and, in 2016, has also been placed on Netflix amongst many other territorial stations globally. Moose also partnered with Universal to create 3 direct-to-video movies for global distribution. 
In 2019, Moose also released a spin-off line of Shopkins intended for preschoolers, Kindi Kids, which was supported by a CGI animated series. In 2021, to promote the toys for Season 5, the brand was supported by a new-look 2D animated series for the series' 4th season.

Moose also created Trash Pack cartoons which ended shortly near the end of the toy franchise in 2014.

In 2016, to promote The Trash Pack's sequel, The Grossery Gang, Moose has done Grossery Gang cartoons which continue to amass views on YouTube. This content includes 3 mini movies and more than 35 webisodes. The first Grossery Gang animated mini movie was released on 28 July 2017 on YouTube to promote Series 3 of the toy franchise.

In 2018, Moose released a digital-first series to support the launch of Treasure X. This 2D content spanned 3 years and continues on MooseTube Mania and the Treasure X Official YouTube pages.

Further work cemented Moose in the boys' space in 2019 with Goo Jit Zu animated content.
First releasing in 2019 and gathering over 120 million views on the 5 mini movies that have followed as of November 2021. Further to this, the content has also been placed on Netflix in English, French and German amongst other distribution platforms.

In 2021, Moose announced their partnership with WildBrain on the brand Akedo. This digital-first series launched in June 2021 and is part of a larger partnership between Moose, Wildbrain and CPLG (Consumer Products). This series was brought to YouTube and Amazon Prime initially in both English and French, with wider distribution to come on additional platforms and in Portuguese, Italian, Spanish and Russian in 2022.

Other
In October 2015, the first official Shopkins app was released to much success.

Licensed Partnerships

Merchandise
Moose has licensed Shopkins for additional products through Bulldog Licensing in the UK, The Licensing Shop in the US, and Merchantwise in Australia.

As of January 2016, 51 Shopkins licencees had been signed in North America, including apparel, construction, candy, games, and bedding. In that same month, Shopkins partnered with McDonald's to release special edition Happy Meal toys.

Toys

Bluey

On June 12, 2019, Moose Toys was named "Global Toy Master" (excluding Asia) for the Australian preschool series, Bluey. Toys based on the show were released in November 2019 in Australia and July (Target) and August (Walmart and Amazon) in 2020 in the U.S.A.

Warner Bros.

Tom & Jerry: The Movie
Space Jam: A New Legacy

Octonauts

Moose Toys partnered up with Silvergate Media to release a toy line to promote Octonauts's spin-off, Octonauts: Above & Beyond.

Strawberry Shortcake

In September 2021, WildBrain named Moose the new toy partner for the relaunched Strawberry Shortcake franchise, with new toys being released for Early 2022.

YouTubers 
 Fortnite 
 ChuChu TV 
 Collins Key

References

Toy companies of Australia
Toy companies established in 1985
Manufacturing companies based in Melbourne
Australian companies established in 1985
Cheltenham, Victoria